The General Aircraft GAL.56 was a family of 1940s British experimental tailless swept wing glider designs.

Background
In July 1943, the Tailless Aircraft Advisory Committee was set up under the Directorate of Scientific Research, within the Ministry of Aircraft Production. The purpose was to investigate the future possible use of tailless and tail-first concepts. In 1944, contract Acft/3303/CB.10(c) was issued to GAL for the construction and development of four unpowered proof-of-concept aircraft, three later designated as GAL.56, plus one GAL.61.

Design
The three GAL.56 variants employed the same fuselage design, married to three different wing designs. The fuselage of the GAL.56 was constructed of steel tubes and wooden ribs, covered in moulded plywood sheeting. Accommodation was for pilot and observer, in tandem cockpits. For each variant, the wings were constructed of laminated wood spars and ribs, covered in wood/paper laminated skins. Each wing was attached to the fuselage by a joint via which the dihedral could be pre-set before flight. Elevons were provided to act as elevators for pitch control, and as servo-assisted ailerons for roll control. Two sets of split flaps were installed, of which either set could be selected before flight. A fin and rudder was mounted at each wingtip. The fixed main undercarriage struts, using existing components, were attached to the wing spars, and an extended tailwheel attached to the rear of the fuselage pod.

Variants
GAL.56/01
(serial number TS507) Also known as the "Medium-V" version, had a constant 33.5 deg wing sweepback at the leading edge, 28.4 deg at quarter chord. On 13 November 1944, Robert Kronfeld piloted the first flight at Farnborough, towed by an Armstrong Whitworth Whitley. 
GAL.56/04
(TS510) Also known as the "Medium-U" version, had the same swept wing planform as the GAL.56/01 mounted outboard of a constant chord centre section, total wingspan 51 ft (15.5 m). First flight was on 27 February 1946, at RAF Aldermaston.
GAL.56/03
(TS513) Also known as the "Maximum-V" version, had a constant 40 deg wing sweepback at the leading edge, 36.4 deg at quarter chord. Wingspan was the same as GAL.56/01. First flight was on 30 May 1946.
GAL.57
A version of the GAL.56 powered by a  Lycoming R-680 radial engine, designed in 1943 but not built.
GAL.61
(TS515) A flying wing with no fuselage or fins, and incorporated retractable tricycle landing gear. It had a raised cockpit for a pilot, offset to port side, and a prone-position in the starboard wing for an observer.

Operational history
The GAL.56/01 conducted numerous flights from RAF Dunholme Lodge and RAF Wittering, variously towed by a Whitley, Supermarine Spitfire, or a Handley Page Halifax. After May 1945, research flights continued at Farnborough, and in August 1947 it was transferred to the GAL Flight Test Department at Lasham Airfield, where the GAL.56/03 and GAL.56/04 were already employed for trials under contract to the Air Ministry.

Its flying characteristics proved so bad that test pilot Capt. Eric "Winkle" Brown RN later described it as the most difficult aircraft he ever flew, out of the many hundreds of types that he tested. On 12 February 1948, the GAL.56/01 was conducting a stalling trial after being towed to 10,000 ft by a Halifax. The pilot, Robert Kronfeld, initiated a stall that progressed into an uncontrollable dive that caused both crew to lose consciousness. The observer, Barry MacGowan, awoke to find that the aircraft was level but inverted. He baled out successfully at low level, but Kronfeld died in the crash at Lower Froyle, near Lasham. As a result of the crash, and persistent stall problems on all tailless aircraft of the period, the research trials were terminated, the two other GAL.56s were transferred to the AFEE (Airborne Forces Experimental Establishment) at RAF Beaulieu, and the GAL.61 remained unflown.

Specifications (GAL.56/01)

References

Citations

Bibliography

External links

 

1940s British experimental aircraft
56
Glider aircraft
Tailless aircraft
Aircraft first flown in 1944
Low-wing aircraft